Snow Blossom is a 2014 Chinese romance film directed by Koan Hui. It was released on January 17, 2014.

Cast
Yang Mi
Feng Shaofeng
Yu Chenghui
Zhang Bo

Reception
The film earned  at the Chinese box office.

References

2014 romance films
Chinese romance films
Wuxia films
2010s Mandarin-language films